Conus zeylanicus, common name the obese cone, is a species of sea snail, a marine gastropod mollusk in the family Conidae, the cone snails and their allies.

These snails are predatory and venomous. They are capable of "stinging" humans, therefore live ones should be handled carefully or not at all.

Description
The size of the shell varies between 27 mm and 78 mm. The shell is obsoletely coronated with tubercles. The stout body whorl is somewhat convex. The ground color of the shell is white or very pale yellow or bluish, faintly clouded, with numerous small chestnut or chocolate spots and short lines, often forming dark clouds, so placed as to make interrupted, revolving bands.

Distribution
This marine species occurs in the Indian Ocean (Tanzania, Mascarene Islands) and eastwards as far as Indonesia.

References

 Drivas, J.; Jay, M. (1987). Coquillages de La Réunion et de l'Île Maurice. Collection Les Beautés de la Nature. Delachaux et Niestlé: Neuchâtel. . 159 pp

External links
 The Conus Biodiversity website
Cone Shells – Knights of the Sea

zeylanicus
Gastropods described in 1987